The European Master of Public Administration Consortium (EMPA) is a network of European schools offering leading master's programs in public administration. Established in 1990-1991, it has developed one of the first multilateral exchange programs for students and scholars of public administration, and issues a joint diploma upon completion of the program.

Members

 KU Leuven
 UCLouvain

 Tallinn University of Technology

 University of Vaasa

 Institut d'Études politiques de Lyon
 Institut d'Études politiques de Paris (Sciences Po)

 German University of Administrative Sciences Speyer

 Corvinus University of Budapest

 University of Limerick

 Leiden University
 Erasmus University Rotterdam

 University of Geneva

 University of Liverpool

See also
 National Association of Schools of Public Affairs and Administration

External links
European Master of Public Administration Consortium

References

Public
Public administration schools
Public policy schools